The greater ghost bat (Diclidurus ingens) is a bat species found in northwestern Brazil, southeastern Colombia, Guyana, Peru, and Venezuela.

References

Bats of South America
Bats of Brazil
Mammals of Colombia
Diclidurus
Mammals described in 1955